Eigerøya is an island in Eigersund municipality in Rogaland county, Norway. The  island lies just off the mainland coast in the town of Egersund. The U-shaped island is divided into two parts by the Lundarviga bay. The northwestern (smaller) side of the island is called Nordre Eigerøya and the larger side on the southeast is called Søre Eigerøya.

The Eigerøy Bridge crosses the strait and connects Eigerøya to the mainland. The island has fish processing industry and other industries. Two lighthouses are located at the island: Eigerøy Lighthouse and Vibberodden Lighthouse.

A naval battle was fought off the island by British and Dutch frigate squadrons at the action of 22 August 1795.

References

Islands of Rogaland
Eigersund